Easley may refer to:

Places in the United States 
 Easley, Alabama, in Blount County, Alabama
 Easley, Iowa
 Easley, Missouri, in Boone County, Missouri
 Easley, South Carolina, in Pickens Counties

Persons 
Easley (name)

Other uses 
Easley McCain Recording
Justice Easley (disambiguation)